Group D of the 2019 FIBA Basketball World Cup was the group stage of the 2019 FIBA Basketball World Cup for the , ,  and . Each team played each other once, for a total of three games per team, with all games played at Foshan International Sports and Cultural Center, Foshan. After all of the games were played, the top two teams with the best records qualified for the Second round and the bottom two teams played in the Classification Round.

Teams

Standings

Games
All times are local (UTC+8).

Angola vs. Serbia
This was the second game between Angola and Serbia in the World Cup. The Serbians won the first meeting in 2010. The Serbians won in the 2016 FIBA World Olympic Qualifying Tournament, the last competitive game between the two teams.

Philippines vs. Italy
This was the second game between the Philippines and Italy in the World Cup. The Italians won the first meeting in 1978, which was also the last competitive game between the two teams.

Italy vs. Angola
This was the second game between Angola and Italy in the World Cup. The Italians won the first meeting in 1990, which was also the last competitive game between the two teams.

Serbia vs. Philippines
This was the first competitive game between Serbia and the Philippines.

Angola vs. Philippines
This was the first competitive game between Angola and the Philippines.

Italy vs. Serbia
This was the first game between Italy and Serbia in the World Cup. Serbia won in its last competitive game against Italy, in EuroBasket 2017.

See also
 2019 Italy FIBA Basketball World Cup team
 2019 Philippines FIBA Basketball World Cup team
 2019 Serbia FIBA Basketball World Cup team

References

External links

2019 FIBA Basketball World Cup
Serbia at the 2019 FIBA Basketball World Cup
Philippines at the 2019 FIBA Basketball World Cup
Italy at the 2019 FIBA Basketball World Cup